Vida Rochelle Blue Jr. (born July 28, 1949) is a former American professional baseball player. He won the American League Cy Young Award and Most Valuable Player Award in 1971.

A six-time All-Star, Blue is the first of only five pitchers in major league history to start the All-Star Game for both the American League (1971) and the National League (1978); Roger Clemens, Randy Johnson, Roy Halladay, and Max Scherzer are the others. During his 17-year career, he pitched for the Oakland Athletics (1969–77), San Francisco Giants (1978–81; 1985–86), and Kansas City Royals (1982–83).

Early life
Vida Blue was born and raised in Mansfield in DeSoto Parish in northwestern Louisiana. He was the oldest of six children born to Vida Blue, Sr, a laborer in a Mansfield iron foundry, and his wife Sallie. In high school, Blue pitched for the baseball team and quarterbacked the football team. In his senior year of football, he threw for 3,400 yards and completed 35 touchdown passes while rushing for 1,600 yards. In his senior year of baseball, Blue threw a no-hitter and also had a 21 strikeout game, in just seven innings pitched. He received several offers to play college football, but after his father died suddenly, Blue signed a contract with the Oakland A's.

Baseball career
Blue was a power pitcher who worked fast and pounded the strike zone. According to Quinn Roberts of MLB.com, Blue possessed "a blistering fastball that could dial up to 100 mph." In The Neyer/James Guide to Pitchers, all-time hits leader Pete Rose stated that Blue "threw as hard as anyone" he ever faced, and baseball historian Bill James cited Blue as the hardest-throwing lefty, and the second-hardest thrower of his era, behind only Nolan Ryan.

Oakland A's

In , after spending the season in the minor leagues with the Midwest League single A Burlington Bees (Iowa) and the Iowa Oaks of the American Association, Blue was called up in September, making two starts that provided a glimpse of what was to come. On September 11, he shut out the Kansas City Royals 3–0, giving up only one hit, to Pat Kelly in the eighth inning. Ten days later, Blue no-hit the defending and eventual repeat American League West champion Minnesota Twins, 6–0, at Oakland–Alameda County Coliseum, the lone baserunner coming on Harmon Killebrew's fourth-inning walk.

Blue had a 24–8 record in 1971, an AL leading 1.82 ERA and 8 shutouts, and struck out 301 batters, winning both the Cy Young and MVP awards. He was the first Athletic to win the latter award since another pitcher, Bobby Shantz, in 1952 with what were then the Philadelphia Athletics. He also led the American League in complete games (24), shutouts (8) and earned run average (1.82). That season, the Athletics won the American League West title for the franchise's first postseason berth since the Philadelphia Athletics in the 1931 World Series. He got off to a terrific start, going 10-1 when he linked up with Boston's Sonny Siebert, who was 8–0, in a dramatic May matchup in Boston. The game was won by Siebert and the Red Sox 4–3, and remains what is considered one of the most dramatic games in Fenway Park history. He was the youngest American League player to win the MVP Award in the 20th century. He was the starting pitcher for the American League in the 1971 All-Star Game, and for the National League in the 1978 All-Star Game.  In 1971 he became the only player ever to be a starting pitcher in the league opener (against the Washington Senators), the All-Star Game and the playoff opener (against the Baltimore Orioles) in the same season.

In 1971, he was on the covers of Sports Illustrated and Time magazine. In 1972, his success in baseball led Blue to a small role in the film Black Gunn, starring Jim Brown.

After Blue's breakthrough season in 1971, he and Athletics owner Charlie Finley clashed over his salary. Blue held out, missing much of the year, and ended up with a 6–10 record in spite of a 2.80 ERA. He did not make the Athletics' post-season starting rotation, instead pitching mainly in relief. Against the Cincinnati Reds in the 1972 World Series he made four appearances, including a save in Game 1, a blown save in Game 4, and a loss in a spot-start in Game 6.

Blue returned to form to go 20–9 in 1973, 17–15 in 1974, and 22–11 in 1975, as an integral member of the Oakland Athletics' five straight American League Western Division pennants from 1971 to 1975, and three consecutive World Championships in 1972, 1973, and 1974. Perhaps his finest postseason performances were four innings of shutout relief work against the Detroit Tigers to save Game 5 of the 1972 American League Championship Series and a complete-game 1–0 shutout against the Orioles in Game 3 of the 1974 ALCS.

On September 28, 1975, Blue, Glenn Abbott, Paul Lindblad and Rollie Fingers combined to no-hit the California Angels 5–0. That no-hitter is, as of 2014, one of only four to be pitched on the final day of a regular season, the others being Mike Witt's perfect game in 1984, Henderson Álvarez's no-hitter in 2013, and Jordan Zimmermann's no-hitter on September 28, 2014. Blue also became the first no-hit pitcher to also pitch in a combined no-hitter; others include: Chicago White Sox hurlers John 'Blue Moon' Odom and Francisco Barrios; the California Angels' Mark Langston and Mike Witt; the Atlanta Braves' Kent Mercker, Mark Wohlers, and Alejandro Peña; and Kevin Millwood and Cole Hamels of the Philadelphia Phillies.

Blue endured a rocky relationship with Athletics owner Charlie Finley. After an 18–13 season with a 2.35 ERA in 1976 he told reporters, "I hope the next breath Charlie Finley takes is his last. I hope he falls flat on his face and dies of polio." In both instances, Kuhn said the trades would be bad for baseball because they would benefit already powerful teams without making them give up any significant talent in return. At the end of the 1976 season, nearly the entire A's roster of star players from Oakland's championship teams left with baseball's new free agency, or were traded off by Finley, leaving Blue, who was still under contract with Oakland, to mentor a new team of primarily rookies and other young players. Alvin Dark, who managed Blue in 1974 and 1975, was surprised that Blue had remained with the team, writing that he "must have gotten the contract concessions he wanted." The 1977 season proved to arguably be Blue's worst in the majors, going 14–19 with a 3.83 ERA and leading the AL both in hits and earned runs surrendered.

Blue was finally traded in March 1978, to the San Francisco Giants for Gary Thomasson, Gary Alexander, Dave Heaverlo, John Henry Johnson, Phil Huffman, Alan Wirth and $300,000. Mario Guerrero was sent to the Athletics just over three weeks later on April 7 to complete the transaction.

San Francisco Giants
In 1978, Blue went 18–10 with a 2.79 ERA as he led the Giants to 89 wins and a third-place finish in the National League West Division, which was won by the Los Angeles Dodgers. His great year was rewarded as he won the Sporting News National League Pitcher of the Year. He, along with Chili Davis, were the last players before Ichiro Suzuki to wear a name on the back of their uniforms other than their surname, both having done so with the Giants.

Blue went 14–14 with a career worst 5.01 ERA as a full-time starter in 1979, 14–10 with a 2.97 ERA again in 1980, and 8–6 with a 2.45 ERA once more in 1981, a strike-interrupted season.  No longer the power pitcher he once was, his strike-out totals (per inning pitched) had fallen by half since his youthful peak.

Kansas City Royals
The 32 year-old Blue joined the Kansas City Royals to start the 1982 season, dealt that March for promising young lefty Atlee Hammaker in a six-man swap.  He went 13–12 with a 3.78 ERA in 31 starts in 31 appearances for a 2nd place club that had improved dramatically from a sub-.500 team in 1981.

The bottom fell out, however, in 1983, with Blue going 0–5 with a 6.01 ERA in 19 appearances, 13 of them starts.  Some time that season a remarkable skein where Blue had started every single game he had appeared in at least since 1973 - a minimum of 340 consecutive starts - but for a single relief appearance in 1976 (when he earned a save finishing that game) came to an end.  A workhorse who had averaged 34 starts and approximately 250 innings pitched per year across an entire decade (including the shortened 111-game 1981 San Francisco season), Blue had also started 23 of 25 games in 1972, possibly extending his games started skein deep into that year as well.

Blue was released mid-season, on August 6, 1983, in the midst of baseball's greatest ever illegal drug scandal, which resulted in the conviction of four players, including Blue.

San Francisco Giants
Blue remained overwhelmed by his drug problem throughout the rest of 1983 and all of 1984, sitting out that entire season.  In April 1985 he returned as a free agent to the San Francisco Giants on a one-year deal, going 8–8 with a 4.47 ERA in 33 appearances, 20 of them starts, the rest in middle-inning and mop-up relief.

He re-signed on another one-year deal in 1986, finishing his career going 10–10 with a 3.27 ERA in 28 appearances, all starts, at the age of 36.

Over his 17-year career he was 209-161 for a .556 win percentage, with a 3.27 ERA over 473 starts in 502 total appearances.  He struck out 2,175 batters in 3,343 innings pitched, and was a 6-time All-Star in addition to his 1971 Cy Young and MVP award wins.

Drug addiction
Blue had Hall of Fame talent but battled drug addiction over the course of his career. After the 1983 season, he and former teammates Willie Wilson, Jerry Martin and Willie Aikens pleaded guilty to attempting to purchase cocaine. In 1985, Blue testified in the Pittsburgh drug trials. Blue's troubles with substance abuse continued to haunt him after his playing career, as he faced multiple DUI charges in 2005. He acknowledged that the trials may have influenced him being left off the Hall of Fame ballot after one year, stating, "I had some issues in my life that might have had a tendency to sway voting. There are some guys in the Hall of Fame who don’t have halos."

Post pitching career
After baseball, Blue made a name and career for himself in the San Francisco Bay Area by donating his time to many charitable causes, mostly promoting baseball in the inner city. Blue currently lives in San Francisco and is active in promoting the sport of baseball.

He is currently a baseball analyst for NBC Sports Bay Area, the TV home of the San Francisco Giants.

Career statistics

Charity work
In 1971, Vida Blue accompanied Bob Hope on his USO Christmas tour of Vietnam and other military installations. Blue remains active, working for numerous charitable causes including Safeway All Stars Challenge Sports, automobile donations, celebrity golf tournaments, and charities for children.

Blue has also been active promoting baseball in Costa Rica.

In popular media
As a guest announcer on the WEEI Red Sox radio broadcast Memorial Day, May 27, 2019, versus the Cleveland Indians, legendary ESPN sportscaster Chris Berman stumped the booth, asking what he described as his favorite baseball trivia question, “Who is the last switch hitter to win the AL MVP?”  The answer: Vida Blue.  Given adoption of the designated hitter in the American League with the 1973 season, and National League in 2022, Vida Blue is likely the last pitcher to be able to accomplish this feat.

See also

 Bay Area Sports Hall of Fame
 List of Major League Baseball career wins leaders
 List of Major League Baseball annual ERA leaders
 List of Major League Baseball career strikeout leaders

References

External links

1949 births
African-American baseball players
American League All-Stars
American League ERA champions
American League Most Valuable Player Award winners
American sportspeople convicted of crimes
Baseball players from Louisiana
Birmingham A's players
Burlington Bees players
Cy Young Award winners
Iowa Oaks players
Kansas City Royals players
Living people
Major League Baseball pitchers
Major League Baseball players suspended for drug offenses
National League All-Stars
Oakland Athletics players
Orlando Juice players
People from Mansfield, Louisiana
San Bernardino Pride players
San Francisco Giants players
St. Lucie Legends players
21st-century African-American people
20th-century African-American sportspeople
United Service Organizations entertainers